Sir Rory MacLeod, 15th Chief of MacLeod (c1559–1626), also known as Roderick Macleod (Scots Gaelic: Ruairidh Mór 'Rory the Great'), was the 15th Chief of Clan MacLeod and one of the most famed and notorious chiefs of that clan.

Biography
Roderick MacLeod of MacLeod, also known as "Rory Mor" or "Ruairidh Mor", was born in Dunvegan, Scotland in 1573 and was the 15th chief of the Clan MacLeod. He was the second son of Norman MacLeod of MacLeod (c. 1516-1585) the 12th chief of the Clan MacLeod. He became chief upon the death of his young nephew in 1595. He married Elizabeth MacDonald, daughter of the 8th Chief of Clan MacDonald of Glengarry circa 1598. Together they had 11 children, 5 sons and 6 daughters including:

 Margaret MacLeod of Macleod, who married Hector Mor Maclean, 16th Chief of Clan Maclean; 
 Mary MacLeod of Macleod who married Sir Lachlan Maclean, 1st Baronet and 17th Chief of Clan Maclean; 
 Ian Mor Macleod of Macleod, 16th Chief (died 1649), who married Sybella Mackenzie, daughter of Kenneth Mackenzie, 1st Lord Mackenzie of Kintail and Anne Ross; 
 Sir Norman MacLeod, 1st Lord of Berneray, 4th Chief of Waternish, who married Katherine Macdonald, daughter of Sir James Mor Macdonald, 9th Laird of Sleat, 2nd Baronet and Margaret Mackenzie. He was knighted by King James VI of Scotland in 1613.

Death

Sir Roderick MacLeod of MacLeod died in 1626 and was buried at the Fortrose Abbey just north of Inverness, Scotland. 

Upon his death, his oldest son John "Iain/Ian Mor Macleod of Macleod, 16th Chief (c. 1600-1649) became chief of the Clan MacLeod.

Notable Battles 
Sir Roderick went to Ireland with 500 of his clan to assist Hugh Roe O'Donnell's war against the English. Upon his return he became involved in a feud with his brother-in-law Donald Gorm Og MacDonald, who was chief of the powerful Clan MacDonald of Sleat. The two clans had fought together in Ireland and had now become enemies when for some reason MacDonald rejected his wife, Sir Roderick's sister, and became very hostile towards his old allies. After a year of feuding, the two clans finally met in the Battle of Coire Na Creiche and the MacLeods were defeated. This was the last clan battle on the Isle of Skye.

In December 1597, an act of the Estates was passed that required that all the Chieftains and Landlords of the Highlands and the Western Isles to produce their title-deeds under pain of forfeiture. Sir Roderick ignored the act and a gift of his estates were given to a number of Fife gentlemen for the purpose of colonisation. After these attempts were dealt with, he was ultimately successful in getting a remission from King James VI of Scotland dated 4 May 1610 for his lands of Harris, Dunvegan, and Glenelg.

Rory Mor's Horn 
One of the prize possessions of the Clan MacLeod is Sir Rory Mor’s Horn. It is kept at Dunvegan Castle on the Isle of Skye, Scotland. Sir Rory Mor's Horn is a drinking horn, made of an ox's horn, tipped in silver. The rim around the mouth of the horn is thick and on this there are imprinted seven medallions. On three of the medallions are beasts, on three others are patterns, and on the seventh and joining medallion is both a pattern and a beast. R. C. MacLeod considered the work to be Norse, and declared the horn to date from the 10th century.

Notes

References

 

Roderick
16th-century births
1626 deaths